Jason Thomas Mraz (born June 23, 1977) is an American guitarist, singer and songwriter. He rose to prominence with the release of his debut studio album, Waiting for My Rocket to Come (2002), which spawned the single "The Remedy (I Won't Worry)", that reached the top 20 on the Billboard Hot 100 chart. His next two studio albums, Mr. A-Z (2005), and We Sing. We Dance. We Steal Things. (2008), peaked in the top five on the Billboard 200; with the latter album spawning the Grammy Award winning singles "Make It Mine", and "Lucky" with Colbie Caillat. 

The album's lead single "I'm Yours", reached the top ten on the Billboard Hot 100, while spending a then-record 76 weeks on the Hot 100, and was certified Diamond by the Recording Industry Association of America (RIAA). His fourth album, Love Is a Four Letter Word (2012), peaked at number two on the Billboard 200, becoming his highest-charting album to date, and spawned the single "I Won't Give Up", which became his second top ten on the Hot 100.

Along with receiving two Grammy Award wins, Mraz is also the recipient of two Teen Choice Awards, a People's Choice Award and the Hal David Songwriters Hall of Fame Award. As of July 2014, Mraz has sold over seven million albums, and over 11.5 million in digital singles. His musical style, from rhythmic feeling to his use of nylon string guitars, has been heavily influenced by Brazilian music.

Early life
Mraz was born and raised in Mechanicsville, Virginia. He is of Czech descent through his grandfather, who moved to the United States from Austria-Hungary in 1915. His parents, Tom (Tomáš ) Mraz and June Tomes, divorced when he was five years old, leaving Mraz to live with his father while his sister lived with his mother. His father is a postal worker, and his mother is vice president at a branch of Bank of America.

Mraz's first concert was Young MC, the rapper known for "Bust a Move."

While attending Lee-Davis High School, Mraz was a member of the cheerleading squad, school chorus, and drama club. He starred as Joseph in Joseph and the Amazing Technicolor Dreamcoat and as Snoopy in a play about the Peanuts characters. Mraz graduated in 1995. 

During this period of his life, he struggled with his sexuality at times, wondering if he was gay.

Mraz credits an early girlfriend as being one of the influences that drove him to songwriting. She encouraged him to write his thoughts on paper which helped him get "all of the voices in my head to shut up" and "become something I could follow."

After high school, Mraz attended the American Musical and Dramatic Academy in New York City for about a year and a half, originally to work in musical theater. When his roommates played guitar he would provide the vocals. Eventually, a friend gave him a guitar that was about to be thrown away and Mraz learned to play and write his own music.  

Mraz moved to the Shockoe Bottom neighborhood of Richmond, Virginia, where he took a series of odd jobs, including elementary-school janitor, and joined the Ashland Stage Company. Mraz then enrolled at Longwood University in Farmville, Virginia, on a scholarship. Instead of attending classes, he headed west on a road trip that ultimately brought him to San Diego, where he decided to stay.

Music career

Coffee house beginnings (2000–01)
Soon after moving to San Diego in 1999, Mraz became a roadie for the band Elgin Park. He met future band member Toca Rivera at Java Joe's, a coffee house in the Ocean Beach neighborhood of San Diego known for being formative in the careers of Jewel and Steve Poltz. Mraz performed once a week for nearly three years, building a following in San Diego and online. 

Mraz released A Jason Mraz Demonstration in 1999, From the Cutting Room Floor and Oh Love, In Sadness (The E Minor EP in F) in 2001, which were self-released and pressed in a limited number of copies. In 2001, Mraz released the live acoustic album Live at Java Joe's, performing with percussionist Rivera and bassist Ian Sheridan. The album featured Mraz's freelancing vocal style and several songs he would later re-release, including "1000 Things", "You and I Both" and "Halfway Home." The album was made available to download on iTunes on March 11, 2008, under the title Jason Mraz: Live & Acoustic 2001. Mraz returned to perform at Java Joe's for the 15th anniversary of the album on January 29, 2016. Mraz' last self-released album was Sold Out (In Stereo) on March 21, 2002.

Waiting for My Rocket to Come (2002–04)
In late 2001, Mraz signed a recording contract with Elektra Records and moved to Los Angeles. In 2002, he opened for Jewel on her tour. On October 15, 2002, Mraz released his first major label debut album, Waiting for My Rocket to Come, which peaked at number 55 on the Billboard 200. The first single, "You & I Both," was sent to radio stations time for the album's release, but received minimal airplay, which led Elektra to reconsider whether a mid-tempo song was the right way to introduce Mraz.

In early 2003, the label took a new approach with the more upbeat "The Remedy (I Won't Worry)." The track was co-written by music production team The Matrix, and became Mraz's first top-40 single on the Billboard Hot 100, peaking at number 15, becoming one of the biggest songs of 2003. The song was inspired by a high school friend who was diagnosed with cancer. At the time of the album's release, Mraz said that he did not like "The Remedy (I Won't Worry)" and had not wanted it on the album because it had started as a special and experimental song and the record label had "chalked up this chorus". The day after the album's release, Mraz played on "The Late Late Show With Craig Kilborn". 

Elektra would return to "You & I Both" a second time, shooting a music video and re-releasing it as the second official single.

On May 19, 2005, Waiting for My Rocket to Come was certified Platinum, for selling 1 million units.

Mraz opened for Tracy Chapman in 2003 at the Royal Albert Hall in London. In 2004, while on tour, Mraz released a live album with an accompanying DVD, Tonight, Not Again: Jason Mraz Live at the Eagles Ballroom. He performed with his touring band, including drummer Adam King, Rivera, Sheridan and keyboardist Eric Hinojosa, along with a guest appearance from Blues Traveler frontman John Popper.

Mr. A–Z (2005–08)
On July 26, 2005, Mraz released his second major label album, Mr. A–Z, produced by Steve Lillywhite for Atlantic Records. The album's lead single, "Wordplay", was produced by Kevin Kadish, and entered the Billboard 200 at number 5. The album earned a Grammy Award nomination for Best Engineered Album, Non-Classical, while Lillywhite received a nomination for Producer of the Year.

Mraz began a long-running tour in support of Mr. A–Z at the San Diego Music Awards on September 12, 2005. The tour featured several opening acts, including Bushwalla and Tristan Prettyman, with whom he had written the duet "Shy That Way" in 2002. Mraz opened for Alanis Morissette during her 2005 Jagged Little Pill Acoustic tour, and for the Rolling Stones on five dates during their 2005–06 world tour. In March 2006, he performed in Singapore as part of the annual Mosaic Music Festival. That May, he toured mostly small venues and music festivals in the U.S., along with a few shows in the United Kingdom and Ireland where he supported James Blunt  The tour included a May 6, 2006 acoustic show with P.O.D., Better Than Ezra, Live, and The Presidents of the United States of America. Mraz was featured as a headlining guest of St. Louis's annual Fair St. Louis and performed a free concert at the base of the Gateway Arch on July 1, 2006. During this time, Mraz was also the opening act at several dates for Rob Thomas' Something to Be Tour.

In 2005, Mraz was one of many singers featured in the fall advertisement campaign for The Gap entitled "Favorites", singing a cover of Bob Marley's "One Love". 2006 saw the release of Selections for Friends, the live, online-only album recorded during the Songs for Friends Tour. In 2007, "The Beauty in Ugly", an earlier track penned by Mraz originally titled "Plain Jane", was rewritten for the ABC television show Ugly Betty. The song was featured as a part of ABC's "Be Ugly in '07" campaign. Also that year, on American Idol, contestant Chris Richardson performed a cover of Mraz's "Geek in the Pink".. In a 2006 concert at EBS Space Gonggam, Mraz said in an interview that he was going to make an acoustic album based on his first two albums.

We Sing. We Dance. We Steal Things. (2008–09)
On May 13, 2008, Mraz released his third studio album, We Sing. We Dance. We Steal Things. The album debuted at number 3 on the Billboard 200. It broke into the top 10 of many international music charts, and reached number 3 in the US and Australia. In March 2009, it was certified Platinum for selling 1 million units. Mraz has said that the album title was taken from the work of Scottish artist David Shrigley. Prior to its release, Mraz released three EPs, each with acoustic versions of songs from the album.

The lead single, "I'm Yours", was written in August 2004 and originally released as a free acoustic B-side when Mr. A-Z came out. Through Mraz's live performances of the song, it gained in popularity with fans. When he played it at a festival in Sweden in 2007, the fans were ecstatic and singing along, after which Mraz realized the song's popularity and decided to make it the centerpiece of his next album. "I'm Yours" became Mraz's first Top 10 hit on the Billboard Hot 100, peaking at #6 on September 20, 2008. It ultimately spent 76 weeks on the Hot 100, longer than any other song in the magazine's 51-year history (a record since broken by Imagine Dragons with "Radioactive" in 2014). It was a major commercial success in the US, receiving a 7x multi-Platinum certification from the RIAA for digital sales of over seven million. The song was also successful internationally, topping the charts in New Zealand, Norway, Portugal and Sweden, and peaking in the top ten on the charts in 11 other countries. By May 2012, it had gained over 125,000,000 hits on YouTube. It was the first song to top the charts in four different radio formats: Mainstream Top 40, Adult Contemporary, Adult Top 40 and Triple A. It also made the Latin Pop and Smooth Jazz charts.

Mraz won his first two Grammy Awards in 2010, for Best Male Pop Vocal Performance ("Make It Mine") and Best Pop Collaboration ("Lucky" with Colbie Caillat). At the 2009 Grammy Awards, "I'm Yours" was nominated for Song of the Year and Best Male Pop Vocal Performance, and We Sing. We Dance. We Steal Things. was nominated for Best Engineered Album, Non-Classical. "I'm Yours" was also named ASCAP's 2010 Song of the Year.

Mraz's 2008 world tour took him all over the United States, Europe, Asia and Australia. His personal photo travelogue from the world tour was published as a book, titled A Thousand Things (2008). The book contains Polaroids from his time touring and backpacking around Europe, and was launched with a photo exhibition at Charles Cowles Gallery in New York City at the end of 2008. Also in 2008, Mraz played with Eric Clapton to a crowd of 45,000 in Hyde Park, London, sold out London's Royal Albert Hall and performed at the Nobel Peace Prize Concert in Oslo. That year also marked his Music, Magic & Make Peace Tour with Bushwalla, The Makepeace Brothers, and magician Justin Willman. Mraz brought along the magician after picking up magic as a hobby during recording sessions for We Sing. We Dance. We Steal Things. On January 31, 2009, Mraz was the musical guest on Saturday Night Live, performing "I'm Yours" and "Lucky", which peaked on the Hot 100 at number 82.

In 2009, Mraz was awarded the Hal David Starlight Award from the Songwriters Hall of Fame.

Love Is a Four Letter Word (2010–13)
In 2009, while preparing for his new album, Mraz recorded "The Way Is Love", an unreleased Roy Orbison song, as a duet with Willie Nelson. In November 2009, he released the live CD/DVD Jason Mraz's Beautiful Mess: Live on Earth, recorded in Chicago during the Gratitude Café tour. The following year, he went to Brazil to record "Simplesmente Todo" with Milton Nascimento, who sings in Portuguese while Mraz sings in English. He also did some writing with Dido, and recorded new material with producer Martin Terefe. Mraz then released two live EPs: the Life Is Good EP on October 5, 2010, and the Live Is A Four Letter Word EP on February 28, 2012.

Love Is a Four Letter Word was released on April 13, 2012. It reached number 2 on the Billboard 200, and the top 20 in 10 other countries. The lead single, "I Won't Give Up", debuted at number 8 on the Billboard Hot 100, and number 1 on the Digital Songs chart. It charted in 15 countries in total, and in October 2013 was certified 4x multi-platinum, for selling in excess of 4 million units. Mraz premiered the track live during his 2011 tour, before an official version had been released. It began to receive a lot of attention through live performances, as well as online. The official lyric video gained over 2.5 million views in its first 10 days on YouTube.

Love Is a Four Letter Word was nominated for a 2012 Grammy Award for Best Engineered Album, Non-Classical. Mraz won a 2013 People's Choice Award for Favorite Male Artist. He performed at Farm Aid 2011 in Kansas City. In 2012 he played sold-out shows at the Hollywood Bowl in Los Angeles, Madison Square Garden in New York and the O2 Arena in London, and performed at President Barack Obama and family's lighting of the national Christmas tree at the White House; a noted Obama supporter, he has also performed at numerous other events involving Obama and Vice President Joe Biden. Also in 2012, he performed "You Did It" at the presentation ceremony for the Kennedy Center's Mark Twain Prize for American Humor, won that year by Ellen DeGeneres.

Yes! (2014)
Mraz's fifth studio album, Yes!, was released on July 15, 2014. It is his first acoustic album, and was recorded with all-female folk rock band Raining Jane. They had previously co-written "A Beautiful Mess" for Mraz's 2008 album We Sing. We Dance. We Steal Things. Aside from a cover of the Boyz II Men song "It's So Hard to Say Goodbye to Yesterday", every song on Yes! was written by Mraz and Raining Jane. The lead single, "Love Someone", was released on May 19, 2014, with Mraz performing an acoustic version of the song for Time. On June 20, 2014, he released We Can Take the Long Way, a music video trilogy for the first three songs on Yes! – "Love Someone", "Hello, You Beautiful Thing" and "Long Drive". It premiered on the USA Today website.

Waitress (2017–18)
On September 27, 2017, it was announced that Mraz would make his Broadway debut in the musical Waitress. He took on the role of Dr. Pomatter on November 3, 2017 for a 10-week run. Sara Bareilles re-joined the cast during his run and he extended his time as Dr. Pomatter playing his final show on February 11, 2018. He had previously sung "Bad Idea" and "You Matter to Me" on Sara Bareilles' 2015 album (based on the show's music) What's Inside: Songs From Waitress.

Know. and Look for the Good (2018–present)
Prior to and following his involvement in Waitress, Mraz began work on a follow-up album to Yes!. In June 2018, he announced his sixth studio album, Know.—a play on the previous album's title— it was released on August 10, 2018. He referred to the new album as "bright and shiny" and a "classic-sounding pop acoustic, vocally driven record with positive lyrics and love songs."

Inspired by a blessing he received from a Buddhist monk during a trip to Myanmar in 2012, Mraz wrote the song "Have It All" with Raining Jane and producers David Hodges, JKash, and Andrew Wells. The song was released as the lead single to the new album on April 27, 2018, and accompanied by a video filmed with performing arts students from his hometown of Richmond. With the announcement of the album in June 2018, Mraz released a second track off of Know. called "Unlonely". In July 2018, Mraz shared the lyric video for the song "More Than Friends", a duet with Meghan Trainor. On August 7, 2018, he partnered with Fathom Events on the one-night-only release of Jason Mraz - Have It All The Movie, a concert film and behind the scenes footage of the making of the "Have It All" video, in 600 movie theaters throughout North America. On August 10, 2018, his sixth album, Know., was released.  In 2019, he was featured on the album The Secret by Alan Parsons as lead vocalist of the song "Miracle". On August 13, 2019, Mraz was named the first-ever District Advocate Ambassador to continue the fight for music creators' rights.  In June 2020, Jason Mraz signed a three multi-album agreement with BMG led by Vice President of A&R Jaime Neely, Executive Vice President of Repertoire & Marketing Thomas Scherer, Vice President of Marketing and Recorded Music Cyndi Lynott, and Vice President of Creative Synch Jonathan Palmer.

On February 15, 2023, Mraz released the single "I Feel Like Dancing" for his upcoming album Mystical Magical Rhythmical Radical Ride, which is set to release on June 23.

Personal life
Mraz lives a health-conscious lifestyle and has said that he eats mostly raw vegan foods. His vegan diet has also influenced his music. He owns a five-and-a-half acre avocado farm in Oceanside, California. He is an investor at Café Gratitude, a vegan restaurant in Los Angeles, and named his 2011 tour Gratitude Café in its honor. His hobbies include surfing, yoga and photography.

Relationships and sexuality
Mraz married Sheridan Edley in 2001. They divorced the following year.

Mraz was engaged to singer-songwriter and long-time close friend Tristan Prettyman on Christmas Eve 2010; they broke off the engagement six months later.

On October 25, 2015, Mraz married his girlfriend, Christina Carano, in a private ceremony in his hometown of Mechanicsville, Virginia.

In June 2018, Mraz penned a "love letter" to the LGBT community, as part of a Billboard feature during gay pride month. A line in the poem, "I am bi your side. / All ways" led some media reports to state that the poem represented Mraz's coming out as bisexual. In an article published on July 19, 2018, by Billboard, Mraz said he has had previous experiences with men, even while dating Carano. Mraz said Carano defined him as a "two-spirit", a description that was criticized by some as misappropriating a word originally designed solely for the native population, and for distorting the term's meaning. In August 2018, Mraz confirmed in an interview with the New York Post that he now identifies as bisexual, speaking of the burden of being closeted ("I honestly didn’t know how to come out and sing these happy love songs..."; "It was tough, 'cause not even my mom knew it, you know? [...] And I realized that’s the struggle that people in the LGBT community have. It can be a very stressful secret that we carry") and the lack of backlash once he came out ("And I think that’s the cosmic joke. We carry around these secrets, and then once you say something, nobody cares").

Social activism and philanthropy

Mraz is a social activist whose philanthropic efforts span wide-ranging issues, including the environment, human rights, and LGBT equality. 

In 2003, after learning one of his beer bottles was listed for sale on eBay, Mraz was inspired to auction off items of his wardrobe online, raising money for the Make a Wish Foundation.

During early tours, he encouraged his fans to drop off food items as they arrived at the venue, an effort to support local food banks.

In 2009, he participated in a rescue mission to Ghana with members of Free the Slaves, a global nonprofit working to liberate children sold into slavery. In 2012, he was featured as the first-ever straight man on the cover of Instinct magazine in recognition of his efforts in support of LGBT rights.

The Jason Mraz Foundation was established in 2011, with a mission to support charities in the areas of human equality, environment preservation and education. Organizations supported by the foundation include VH1's Save The Music Foundation, MusiCares, Surfrider Foundation, Free the Children, Life Rolls On, the School of the Performing Arts in the Richmond Community, the Natural Resources Defense Council, and the True Colors Fund, which promotes LGBT equality.

Mraz was named the 2010 Surf Industry Manufacturers Association (SIMA) Humanitarian of the Year. He also received the Clean Water Award in 2010 from the Surfrider Foundation, for helping to preserve the world's oceans and beaches. That same year, he teamed up with The Nature Conservancy and created a PSA using his song "I'm Yours" to raise awareness about the nonprofit organization's efforts to protect the earth.

On December 16, 2012, Mraz headlined the Milestone Concert in Myanmar to raise awareness about human trafficking, making him the first foreign artist to play an open-air concert in Myanmar. The concert was organized by MTV EXIT and held in the People's Square in Yangon, with over 70,000 people in attendance, as part of an initiative to raise awareness about human trafficking in Myanmar. Also in 2012, Mraz spent a week in Antarctica with a group of environmentalists, scientists and researchers on a mission led by Al Gore, to learn about the effects of climate change.

Mraz is a continued supporter of WhyHunger, a grassroots support organization dedicated to fighting hunger and poverty in the United States. The organization was founded by late musician Harry Chapin  and Radio DJ Bill Ayres in 1975.

On June 19, 2020, Mraz announced he would be donating all profits from his album "Look for the Good" to Black Lives Matter and other organizations working toward equality and justice.

Politics
On October 24, 2019, Mraz endorsed Bernie Sanders for President in the 2020 Democratic Party presidential primaries stating, "Bernie is the perfect candidate to follow Trump & continue to shake up the system for the benefit of true American values: Life, Liberty & The Pursuit of Happiness".

Discography

Studio albums
Waiting for My Rocket to Come (2002)
Mr. A–Z (2005)
We Sing. We Dance. We Steal Things. (2008)
Love Is a Four Letter Word (2012)
Yes! (2014)
Know. (2018)
Look for the Good (2020)
Mystical Magical Rhythmical Radical Ride (2023)

Awards and nominations
{| class="wikitable sortable plainrowheaders" 
|-
! scope="col" | Award
! scope="col" | Year
! scope="col" | Nominee(s)
! scope="col" | Category
! scope="col" | Result
! scope="col" class="unsortable"| 
|-
! scope="row" rowspan=4|Grammy Awards
| rowspan="2"|2009
| rowspan="2"|"I'm Yours"
| Song of the Year
| 
| rowspan=4|
|-
| rowspan=2|Best Male Pop Vocal Performance
| 
|-
| rowspan="2"|2010
| "Make It Mine"
| 
|-
| "Lucky" (with Colbie Caillat)
| Best Pop Collaboration with Vocals
| 
|-
! scope="row" rowspan=2|Pop Awards
| rowspan=2|2021
| Himself
| Icon of the Year
| 
| rowspan=2|
|-
| Look for the Good
| Album of the Year
| 
|-
! scope="row" rowspan=15|San Diego Music Awards 
| rowspan=2|2002
| rowspan=3|Himself
| Best Acoustic
| 
| rowspan=2|
|-
| rowspan=2|Artist of the Year
| 
|-
| rowspan=2|2003
| 
| rowspan=2|
|-
| "The Remedy (I Won't Worry)"
| Song of the Year
| 
|-
| 2004
| rowspan=2|Himself
| rowspan=2|Artist of the Year
| 
| 
|-
| rowspan=3|2009
| 
| rowspan=2|
|-
| "Lucky" (with Colbie Caillat)
| Song of the Year
| 
|-
| We Sing. We Dance. We Steal Things.
| Album of the Year
| 
| 
|-
| rowspan=4|2014
| Himself
| Artist of the Year
| 
| rowspan=2|
|-
| rowspan=2|"Love Someone"
| Best Music Video
| 
|-
| Song of the Year
| 
| rowspan=2|
|-
| Yes!
| Album of the Year
| 
|-
| rowspan=3|2019
| Himself
| Artist of the Year
| 
| rowspan=3|
|-
| "Have It All"
| Song of the Year
| 
|-
| Know.
| Album of the Year
|

Other awards

|-
| 2004
| rowspan=2|Jason Mraz
| Pollstar Concert Industry Awards for Best New Touring Artist 
| 
|-
| rowspan=4|2009
| Teen Choice Award for Choice Music – Male Artist
| 
|-
| We Sing. We Dance. We Steal Things. 
| Teen Choice Award for Choice  Album (Male Artist)
| 
|-
| rowspan=3|Jason Mraz
| American Music Award for Favorite Adult Contemporary Artist 
| 
|-
| Songwriters Hall of Fame Hal David Starlight Award
| 
|-
| style="text-align:center;" | 2010
| People's Choice Award for Favorite Male Artist
| 
|-
| style="text-align:center;" | 2010
| "I'm Yours"
| ASCAP Song of the Year
| 
|-
| style="text-align:center;" | 2010
| Jason Mraz
| Surf Industry Manufacturers Association Humanitarian of the Year 
| 
|-
| style="text-align:center;" | 2010
| Jason Mraz
| Surfrider Foundation Clean Water Award
| 
|-
| style="text-align:center;" | 2012
| rowspan="2" | "I Won't Give Up"
| Best Love Song
| 
|-
| style="text-align:center;" | 2012
| MVPA Awards for Best Adult Contemporary Video
|  
|-
| style="text-align:center;" | 2012
| Jason Mraz
| ASCAP Foundation Champion Award
| 
|-
| style="text-align:center;" | 2013
| Jason Mraz
| People's Choice Award for Pop Male Artist
| 
|-
| style="text-align:center;" | 2013
| Jason Mraz
| MTV Europe Music Award For Best World Stage
| 
|-

Bibliography
 A Thousand Things (2008, I Love Books)

Filmography

Film

Television appearances (selected)

 American Music Awards (2003)
 Late Night with Conan O'Brien (2003)
 The Tonight Show with Jay Leno (2003, 2005, 2008)
 New Year's Rockin' Eve (2004)
 The Ellen DeGeneres Show (2004, 2006, 2008, 2009, 2014)
 Jimmy Kimmel Live! (2004, 2005, 2009, 2012)
 EBS Space Gonggam (EBS 스페이스 공감) (2006)
 Late Show with David Letterman (2008, 2009, 2012)
 Nobel Peace Prize Concert (2008)
 Rachael Ray (2008)
 American Idol (2009, 2019)
 Saturday Night Live (2009, 2019)
 Spicks and Specks (TV series) (2009)
 The Tonight Show with Conan O'Brien (2009)
 Grammy Awards (2009, 2010)
 Family Guy (2010)
 The Jay Leno Show (2010)
 Sesame Street (2010)
 Chelsea Lately (2012)
 Conan (2012)
 Dancing With the Stars (2012)
 The Fresh Beat Band (2012)
 Late Night with Jimmy Fallon (2012)
 Opening Act (2012)
 Today (2012)
 VH1 Storytellers (2012)
 Watch What Happens: Live (2012)
 Live from Daryl's House (2012)
 American Restoration (2015)
 Live from the Artists Den (2014)
 K-pop Star 4 (케이팝 스타 4) (2015)
 Today Show with Hoda and Jena (2019)
 Celebrity Show-Off (2020)
 Celebrity Wheel of Fortune (2021)
 Rick and Morty'' (2022) - Brachiosaurus (voice; in "Juricksic Mort")

References

External links

 
 
 
 Jason Mraz collection at the Internet Archive's live music archive
 Playlist: Jason Mraz – Nightline 07/17/09 – Reggae to rock, Mraz reveals his musical influences.

 
1977 births
American male singer-songwriters
American people of Czech descent
Atlantic Records artists
Bisexual male actors
Bisexual singers
Bisexual songwriters
Elektra Records artists
Grammy Award winners
LGBT people from Virginia
LGBT producers
American LGBT rights activists
American LGBT singers
American LGBT songwriters
Living people
Musicians from Richmond, Virginia
Musical groups from San Diego
Singer-songwriters from Virginia
American folk-pop singers
Guitarists from Virginia
American male guitarists
People from Mechanicsville, Virginia
21st-century American singers
20th-century LGBT people
21st-century LGBT people
Singer-songwriters from California
American Musical and Dramatic Academy alumni